Nextlevelism is the third studio album released by drum and bass and dubstep producer DJ Fresh. The album was released in the United Kingdom on 1 October 2012. The album spawned the hit singles "Louder", "Hot Right Now", "The Power" and "The Feeling", as well as featuring "Gold Dust".

Singles
 "Louder", featuring Sian Evans, was released as the lead single from the album on 3 July 2011. It peaked at No. 1 on the UK Singles Chart.
 "Hot Right Now", featuring Rita Ora, was released as the second single from the album on 12 February 2012. It also peaked at No. 1 on the UK Singles Chart.
 "The Power", featuring Dizzee Rascal, was released as the third single from the album on 3 June 2012. It peaked at No. 6 on the UK Singles Chart.
 "The Feeling", featuring RaVaughn, was released as the fourth single from the album on 23 September 2012. It peaked at No. 13 on the UK Singles Chart.
 "Gold Dust", featuring Ms. Dynamite, was released as the fifth single from the album on 2 December 2012. It peaked at No. 22 on the UK Singles Chart.

Track listing

Charts

Release history

References

2012 albums
DJ Fresh albums
Ministry of Sound albums